Red Splash (foaled May 1919) was a British racehorse who won the inaugural Cheltenham Gold Cup.

Background
Red Splash was a chestnut gelding with a white blaze and two white socks bred in England. He was not technically a Thoroughbred as his sire Copper Ore was descended from a mare of unknown pedigree. Red Splash's dam La Manche was a descendant of the influential Irish broodmare The Beauty.

During his racing career, Red Splash was owned by Major Humphrey Wyndham and was trained by Fred Withington at Fritwell in Oxfordshire. Withington was best known for training Rubio and Mattie MacGregor to finish first and second in the 1908 Grand National.

Racing career
Red Splash showed early promise as a steeplechaser and won four times over fences in the 1923/1924 National Hunt season including a race at Cheltenham Racecourse in November. In the spring, he was entered in the inaugural Cheltenham Gold Cup in which, as a five-year-old, he carried nine pounds fewer than his older opponents. Withington had reservations about running the horse in the race as Red Splash had sustained an injury which interrupted his preparation. The likely favourite, Alcazar, was withdrawn on the morning of the race, and his jockey, Dick Rees, was engaged to take the ride on Red Splash. The five-year-old started at odds of 5/1 in a nine-runner field with his biggest rivals looking to be Forewarned, Gerald L, and Conjuror (third in the 1923 Grand National). After leading in the early stages, Red Splash dropped back but recovered to regain the lead at the second-last fence. The final stages saw a sustained three-way struggle as Red Splash fought off strong challenges from Conjuror and Gerald L to prevail by a head and a neck.

Following his victory at Cheltenham, Red Splash was highly regarded, being described as showing "marked dash in leaping his fences" and likely to become a leading Grand National contender.

In the following season, Red Splash suffered from injuries and training problems. He was off the racecourse for ten months before being well beaten in a minor event at Leicester Racecourse in January 1925. Plans to run in the Champion Chase at Aintree Racecourse in April came to nothing, and he never contested another major race.

Assessment and honours
In their book A Century of Champions, based on the Timeform rating system, John Randall and Tony Morris rated Red Splash a "poor" Gold Cup winner.

Pedigree

References 

1919 racehorse births
Racehorses bred in the United Kingdom
Racehorses trained in the United Kingdom
Thoroughbred family 11-d
Cheltenham Gold Cup winners
Cheltenham Festival winners
National Hunt racehorses
Non-Thoroughbred racehorses